Football Club Fidene was an Italian association football club located in Rome, Lazio.

History 
The club was founded in 1963.

In summer 2013 the club was not able to enter 2013–14 Serie D and was so subsequently liquidated.

Colors and badge 
Its colors were red and green.

Club

Last staff & board members 

 President :  Stefano Morandi
 Secretary :  Domenico Fugà
 Physios :   Andrea Acquaroni

2011–12 Season players 

Defunct football clubs in Italy
Defunct football clubs in Lazio
Football clubs in Rome
Association football clubs established in 1963
Association football clubs disestablished in 2013
Italian football clubs established in 1963
2013 disestablishments in Italy